Robert Saul Greenberg (born July 27, 1947) is an American film and television cinematographer best known for films including Free Willy.

Filmography
Bizarre Devices (1973)
Lucifer's Women (1974)
Doctor Dracula (1978)
Youngblood (1978)
The Lathe of Heaven (TV) (1980)
Butcher, Baker, Nightmare Maker (1981)
Swamp Thing (1982)
Time Walker (1982)
The Winter of Our Discontent (TV) (1983)
Movers & Shakers (1985)
Creator (1985)
Sweet Dreams (1985)
Second Serve (TV) (1986)
The Milagro Beanfield War (1988)
Far North (1988)
All I Want for Christmas (1991)
Free Willy (1993)
Squanto: A Warriors Tale (1993)
Under Siege 2: Dark Territory (1995)
Sunset Park (1995)
Fools Rush In (1997)
Winchell (TV) (1998)
Introducing Dorothy Dandridge (TV) (1999)
Snow Day (2000)
If These Walls Could Talk 2 (TV) (2000)
Save the Last Dance (2001)
James Dean (TV) (2001)
A Guy Thing (2001)
Marci X (2002)
Iron Jawed Angels (TV) (2004)
The Santa Clause 3: The Escape Clause (2006)
Even Money (2006)
Wild Hogs (2007)

In 1999–2000, Robbie Greenberg won 2 Emmy Awards for Outstanding Cinematography for a Miniseries or a Movie for Winchell and Introducing Dorothy Dandridge.

References

External links
 

1947 births
Living people
American cinematographers